Born Again is the fourteenth studio album by the Christian rock band Newsboys. It was released on 13 July 2010 and is the first full-length album with lead singer Michael Tait, as well as the first album to feature no original members in the lineup. The group released a special five-track preview EP, also titled Born Again, on 5 January 2010. Four tracks from the EP appeared on the album. The exception, and first single released, was "I'll Be", which was made available on deluxe versions of the album. The album was later reissued as Born Again: Miracles Edition in April 2011, that included five new songs, four remixes and replaced "Impossible" with the new song, "Save Your Life". The album produced two music videos for the title track and "Miracles".

Commercial performance
The album debuted at No. 4 on the Billboard 200 charts with 45,000 copies, shattering their previous peak position of No. 28 with 2009's In the Hands of God. The album also became the group's fourth No. 1 album on the Christian charts. As of 20 October 2010, the album has sold 114,863 copies.

Track listing

Personnel
Adapted from the album booklet.

Newsboys
 Michael Tait – lead vocals
 Jody Davis – guitars, vocals
 Jeff Frankenstein – keyboards, key bass, vocals
 Duncan Phillips – drums, percussion
Additional musicians
 Chanel Campbell – background vocals
 KJ-52 – rap on "Jesus Freak"
 Israel Houghton – background vocals on "We Remember"
 Peter Furler – backing vocals on "Glorious"

Production and design
 Seth Mosley –  mixing, engineering
 Dale Bray – A&R
 Wes Campbell – manager
 David Molnar – cover photo
 Jake Rye - audio engineering, bass guitar, production
 Breezy Baldwin – additional photography, packaging design and layout
 F. Reid Shippen – mixing
 Robot Lemon Studios, Nashville, Tennessee – mixing location
 Dan Shike – mastering
 Tone & Volume, Nashville, Tennessee – mastering location

References

Newsboys albums
2010 albums
Inpop Records albums